Emil Jand (born 24 September 1890, date of death unknown) was an Austrian rowing coxswain. He competed in the men's coxed four event at the 1912 Summer Olympics.

References

1890 births
Year of death missing
Austrian male rowers
Olympic rowers of Austria
Rowers at the 1912 Summer Olympics
People from Teplice District
Coxswains (rowing)